"Breaking the Law" is a song by English heavy metal band Judas Priest, originally released on their 1980 album British Steel. The song is one of the band's better known singles, and is readily recognised by its opening guitar riff.

Composition
Prior to releasing 1980's British Steel, Judas Priest had been making moves toward streamlining their music into a simpler, less processed sound. That approach came to full fruition on British Steel. "Breaking the Law" combines a recognisable minor-key opening riff and a rhythmic chorus as its main hooks. There is a change-up on the mostly instrumental bridge, a new chord progression with Halford shouting "You don't know what it's like!" before the sound effect of a police car's siren leads back into the main riff. More recent live performances of the song have featured a short solo by Downing over the bridge. The outro of the song is the main riff played repeatedly with Halford singing the chorus and Downing playing power chords.

The song features some sound effects, including the sound of breaking glass and a police siren. The band were recording British Steel at Tittenhurst Park, which was the home of the Beatles's drummer Ringo Starr. For the breaking glass effect, the band used milk bottles that a milkman brought them in the morning, and the police siren was actually guitarist K. K. Downing using the tremolo arm on his Stratocaster.

Halford later said, "It was a time in the U.K. when there was a lot of strife-a lot of government strife, the miners were on strike, the car unions were on strike, there were street riots. It was a terrible time. That was the incentive for me to write a lyric to try to connect with that feeling that was out there."

Music video
Directed by Julien Temple, the video starts with vocalist Rob Halford singing from the back of a 1974 Cadillac Fleetwood Eldorado convertible. Halford meets with two men dressed as priests carrying guitar cases and they enter the bank together. For the breaking the law chorus the two men remove their disguises and are revealed to be guitarists K. K. Downing and Glenn Tipton. They are then joined by bassist Ian Hill and drummer Dave Holland. The people in the bank are incapacitated by the guitars. Meanwhile, the security guard (who has only just awoken) watches on in amazement on the CCTV screens. The band breaks into the safe (with Halford showing "extraordinary" strength in pulling apart the iron bars). Halford takes from the safe a golden record award for the British Steel album (the music video was shot before the album went platinum). They soon leave the bank with the record and drive away. Concert footage of Judas Priest is now on the CCTV screens, and the security guard is seen miming along with a fake guitar, very much lost in the music. The video ends with the full band driving back along the A40 repeating the chorus until the song is finished.

Downing later said, "I have to chuckle to myself really about how they got us to do whatever it was we were doing. But we were young and it was exciting and we were making probably the first ever heavy metal conceptual video. It reminds us that however big and powerful we were, we still did everything that people wanted us to do..."

Performances
Since British Steel was released, "Breaking the Law" has been a popular staple at some of Judas Priest's most famous performances. The performance version of the song has changed since it was first performed on the 1981 World Wide Blitz Tour for the follow up to British Steel, Point of Entry: at first, the band would play it the original way it was on British Steel. Later, the band sometimes (for example on the Angel of Retribution tour) played the opening riff with Halford picking for Downing, Downing picking for Tipton and Tipton picking for Hill, then quickly spreading apart to their respective usual positions on the stage for the verse. Over time, the band have raised the tempo of the song during live performances, and a solo was added by Downing (since his departure, his replacement Richie Faulkner composed a new solo, replacing Downing's). In live performances, Halford ends the song by screaming the words "Breaking the Law".

Critical reception
In 2009 it was named the 12th greatest hard rock song of all time by VH1.

PopMatters said the song "opens with one of the most famous riffs in metal history, wasting no time getting into listeners' heads.

Personnel
Rob Halford – vocals
K. K. Downing – guitars
Glenn Tipton – guitars
Ian Hill – bass
Dave Holland – drums

B-side 

"Metal Gods" is a song by Judas Priest from their album British Steel. The song was also released as the B-side to the song "Breaking the Law".

Composition
Sounds produced by billiard cues and trays of cutlery can be heard in the song.

Frontman Rob Halford said about the song in a Billboard article: "I'm a bit of a science-fiction fan, and I think I got the lyrics from that world-robots and sci-fi and metal gods, just by word association. It's a statement against Big Brother or something, about these metal gods that were taking over". Guitarist K.K. Downing said: "When we were recording that track we had loads and loads of fun trying to make it sound as metal as we can. We were shaking cutlery trays in front of the microphones to create the sound of metal marching feet". Halford added: "In those days there wasn't an Internet, so you couldn't go online and download samples. So we would whip a piece of guitar chord on a flight case or swish a pool cue in front of a microphone for the audio effects. I lifted and dropped that cutlery tray 100 times, I think". Downing also added: "Ringo Starr actually owned the house when we were there, so we would go around to see what Ringo had that we could put on our record. So I guess it's Ringo's knives and forks that created the true 'Metal Gods' sound, which is pretty funny to realise".

Charts

References

External links
 Official music video at YouTube

1980 singles
Judas Priest songs
Songs written by Rob Halford
Songs written by Glenn Tipton
Songs written by K. K. Downing
1980 songs
Columbia Records singles
Music videos directed by Julien Temple
Protest songs